Jason Andre Karnuth (born May 15, 1976) is a former Major League Baseball relief pitcher most recently with the Milwaukee Brewers organization.

In 2007, Karnuth was the accidental victim of an attack by Roman Colón. During Colón's rehab assignment in Triple-A Toledo, Colón was involved in an altercation with fellow pitcher Jordan Tata. During the course of the fight, Colón attempted to punch Tata and instead landed a punch to the face of Karnuth, the Mud Hens closer who was trying to intercede and break up the fight. The resulting injury caused Karnuth to be admitted to the hospital and undergo plastic surgery to his face. According to his wife, who filed an assault report against Colón on her husband's behalf, Karnuth required a titanium plate to be screwed into his head. Karnuth missed most of the 2007 season as a result of the injuries. The Tigers suspended Colón for 7 days after the incident. On January 15, 2008, Colon pleaded no contest to an assault charge and was sentenced to 200 hours of community service.

He retired on February 29, 2008.

References

External links

1976 births
Living people
Major League Baseball pitchers
Baseball players from Illinois
Sportspeople from La Grange, Illinois
St. Louis Cardinals players
Detroit Tigers players
New Jersey Cardinals players
Peoria Chiefs players
Prince William Cannons players
Arkansas Travelers players
Memphis Redbirds players
New Haven Ravens players
West Tennessee Diamond Jaxx players
Iowa Cubs players
Erie SeaWolves players
Toledo Mud Hens players
Sacramento River Cats players
Illinois State Redbirds baseball players